Jen Bartel is an American illustrator and comic artist, best known for her work for Marvel Comics and Image Comics. She co-created the comic Blackbird for Image with Sam Humphries. She won an Eisner Award for her work as a cover artist in 2019.

Career
Bartel was scouted for mainstream comics cover work after she published her fan art on social media platforms.

Bartel created the cover art for Star Wars: Women of the Galaxy, and DC: Women of Action, both published by Chronicle Books.

She created graphic designs for Adidas brand shoes featuring the Marvel Cinematic Universe character Captain Marvel, and Marvel Cinematic Universe character Thanos tied in with the releases of the Captain Marvel and Avengers: Endgame films in 2019.

Bartel also created graphic designs for the Puma and Foot Locker corporation featuring DC Extended Universe character Harley Quinn timed to coincide with the release of the DC Extended Universe film Birds of Prey (and the Fantabulous Emancipation of One Harley Quinn).

Awards
She won an Eisner Award for her work as a cover artist on Blackbird (Image) and Submerged (Vault) in 2019, and was nominated in 2020.

In 2018, The Marvel Comic America to which Bartel contributed as one artist among 18 creators, was nominated for a GLAAD media award.

References

External links
Official Bartel website

21st-century American women artists
American female comics artists
Image Comics
Living people
Shoe designers
Year of birth missing (living people)